PaTaank is a video game developed and published by PF Magic for the 3DO.

Gameplay 

Pataank is a pinball game where the player steers the pinball, hitting it into targets.

Development and release

Reception 

Next Generation reviewed the game, rating it two stars out of five, and stated that "It's an interesting idea, done badly." Entertainment Weekly gave the game an A−.

References

External links
 PaTaank at GameFAQs
 PaTaank at Giant Bomb
 PaTaank at MobyGames

1994 video games
3DO Interactive Multiplayer games
3DO Interactive Multiplayer-only games
BMG Interactive games
Multiplayer and single-player video games
Pinball video games
Video games developed in the United States